Dominik Meffert and Björn Phau won the title, defeating Teymuraz Gabashvili and Andrey Kuznetsov 6–4, 6–3 in the final.

Seeds

  Colin Ebelthite /  Adam Feeney (semifinals)
  Facundo Bagnis /  Horacio Zeballos (first round)
  Martin Slanar /  Simon Stadler (quarterfinals)
  Dominik Meffert /  Björn Phau (champions)

Draw

Draw

References
 Main Draw

Internationaler Apano Cup - Doubles